Aiguo Dai is a Chinese-American atmospheric scientist and professor in the Department of Atmospheric and Environmental Sciences at the University at Albany, SUNY. Before joining the University at Albany in 2012 as an associate professor, he worked at the National Center for Atmospheric Research, which he first joined in 1999 as a project scientist.

Work
An ISI highly cited researcher, Dai's areas of research include climate variability and projecting future climate change, such as changes in the global water cycle and droughts. For example, he published a study in 2010 projecting that many heavily populated areas of the world (such as southern Europe and northern Africa) could see severe drought before 2100. He has also published a study showing that the difference between the global warming hiatus and model predictions was largely due to the Interdecadal Pacific Oscillation. He has also studied changes in drought worldwide under global warming, finding that drought has gotten worse since 1923.

References

External links
Aiguo Dai's faculty page

Living people
American climatologists
Chinese climatologists
Intergovernmental Panel on Climate Change contributing authors
University at Albany, SUNY faculty
National Center for Atmospheric Research faculty
Nanjing University alumni
Columbia University alumni
American people of Chinese descent
Year of birth missing (living people)